David Christison MD FRCPE LLD (1830–1912) was a Scottish physician, botanist, writer and antiquary. He served as a military doctor during the Crimean War, at which time, owing to illness, he abandoned his medical career. From the 1860s onwards Christison travelled extensively in South America and became a travel writer, publishing an account of his journeys within Paraguay, and other books on topics relating to that country. He also turned to archaeology in which, through his interest in botany, he made advances in the science of dendrochronology. He became a pioneer of systematic field study in archaeological research and was one of the first to carry out an extensive investigation of Scotland's ancient hillforts, writing and publishing extensively on the topic in later life.

Birth and education

Christison was born on 25 January 1830 (Robert Burns Day) in Edinburgh's New Town, at 3 Great Stuart Street on the Moray Estate. He was the second son of Sir Robert Christison, 1st Baronet, distinguished medical physician, and Henrietta Sophia Brown. After his education at the Edinburgh Academy, the young Christison initially chose to follow in his father's footsteps, going on to train in Medicine at Edinburgh University. He began his medical career in the Old Royal Infirmary where his peer group included Joseph Lister, Patrick Heron Watson and Alexander Struthers, brother of the anatomist John Struthers. Christison gained his first doctorate (MD) in 1851.

Crimea
In 1854, Christison volunteered to tend troops serving in the Crimean War. He travelled out to serve thus in the conflict zone as part of a group of fellow Scots, including his brother-in-law John Beddoe. In the course of his work there, while stationed at the Renkioi military hospital in the Dardanelles, he fell seriously ill and had to terminate his medical career. Another of his colleagues from Royal Infirmary days, Alexander Struthers, while similarly engaged, died in the British Army's infamous Scutari Hospital in Istanbul where illnesses were rife due to poor conditions.

South America
From 1867 onwards, in an effort to improve his health, Christison began to take trips to South America. His travels included journeys to Argentina and Uruguay principally to study the plant life, although his interests were also general. As a travel writer, he would later publish a series of books on the subject of the latter country in particular, including: A Journey into Central Uruguay (1880), The Gauchos of San Jorge, Central Uruguay (1881) and Thunder Squalls in Uruguay (1887).

Archaeological observations
After no longer being able to pursue his career in the medical profession, Christison threw himself into archaeology, becoming a strong advocate for methodical and rigorous observation in the discipline. He undertook a systematic study of Scotland's hillforts through field research,  visiting a large number of sites the length and breadth of the country over a good many years, publishing meticulously considered accounts of his findings for each on a regular basis in Proceedings of the Society of Antiquaries of Scotland, and taking care to consider comparisons between other sites more widely. His careful expositions often include direct witness of examples of thoughtless loss, damage and degradation to unprotected sites in his lifetime, as for example the following on the Castle of Doon, Ayrshire, in 1893:

"This interesting ruin is situated on a small, smooth rock-island in Loch Doon, and the whole space between the walls and the water [...] is covered with loose blocks, certainly not derived from the castle wall of enciente, which still stands to nearly its full height; although, alas! tottering to its fall, the stones of the pediment having been disgracefully allowed to be torn away a few years ago — a wanton destruction of one of the most interesting ruins in Scotland which is to be lamented."

In 1894, Christison delivered the Rhind lectures and eventually published a connected analysis of his results in his book, Early Fortifications in Scotland (1898). As the first comprehensive survey of hillforts in any region of the British Isles, often critical of previous neglect of the subject, it was through this work that Christison helped to pioneer a fuller and more meticulous understanding of the history and significance of these sites than had hitherto been the case. His example became a model for subsequent national and regional studies.

Christison was Secretary of the Society of Antiquaries of Scotland in 1891 when the society's sizable collection of objects of historical and cultural interest to Scotland was transferred to the newly opened National Museum of Antiquities of Scotland. This was housed in Robert Rowand Anderson's distinctive custom-built red sandstone gallery building, designed also for the Scottish National Portrait Gallery, with each institution at that time occupying one half of the building side-by-side.

Recognition
In 1906 Christison was awarded an honorary doctorate (LLD) by Dean Ludovic Grant on behalf of Edinburgh University.

His portrait in stained glass by William Graham Boss forms one of the multiple portraits of members of the Society of Antiquaries of Scotland on the main stair of the Scottish National Portrait Gallery.

He died on 21 January 1912 and is buried in the family plot at New Calton Burial Ground.

Family
In 1870, Christison's residence in Edinburgh was at 40 Moray Place. In later life he lived at 20 Magdala Crescent in Edinburgh's West End.  Part of Edinburgh's Christison dynasty, he was married to Susannah Hodgson Brown, a cousin. In 1914, their only son, John Alexander Christison, died suddenly of malaria while in Uganda. They also had three daughters.

Selected publications

A Journey to Central Uruguay (1880) 
The Gauchos of San Jorge, Central Uruguay (1881)
The Life of Sir Robert Christison (1885)
Thunder Squalls in Uruguay (1887)
The Size, Age and Rate of Girth Increase achieved by trees of the Chief Species in Britain, particularly in Scotland (1893)
On the Geographical Distribution of Certain Place Names in Scotland (1893)
Prehistoric Forts of Scotland (1896) the Rhind Lecture
Early Fortifications in Scotland: Motes, Camps and Forts (1898)
Excavation of the Roman Station at Ardoch, Perthshire (1898)
The Excavation of Rough Castle on the Antonine Wall (1905)

References
 

1830 births
1912 deaths
Scientists from Edinburgh
People educated at Edinburgh Academy
Alumni of the University of Edinburgh
19th-century Scottish medical doctors
Scottish archaeologists
Younger sons of baronets